Matijasevic is a Slavic surname. Notable people with the surname include:

 Darko Matijašević, Bosnian politician
 Vladimir Matijašević, Serbian football player
 Yuri Matiyasevich, Russian mathematician and computer scientist
 Mikhail Matiyasevich, Soviet military commander